Live In Japan is the fifteenth overall, tenth North American, and second live concert album by the a cappella group Rockapella. It was recorded during the group's "Wa" (Peace) Tour on June 2–12, 2003 at The Blue Note and was released a year later. Live In Japan is the final album founding member Elliott Kerman can be heard on, marking a key piece of Rockapella history as the group no longer contains any of its founding members. It is also the last album Kevin Wright can be heard on, since he left the group in December 2009.

Track listing

Personnel
Scott Leonard – high tenor
Kevin Wright – tenor
Elliott Kerman – baritone
George Baldi III – bass
Jeff Thacher – vocal percussion

References

Rockapella albums
2004 live albums